Przeszkoda  is a village in the administrative district of Gmina Żabia Wola, within Grodzisk Mazowiecki County, Masovian Voivodeship, in east-central Poland.

External links
 Jewish Community in Przeszkoda on Virtual Shtetl

References

Przeszkoda